Milad Ahmadian; is an Iranian football goalkeeper who currently plays for Iranian football club Paykan in the Iran Pro League.

Club career

Paykan
Emamali started his career with Steel Azin from youth levels. He made his professional debut for Paykan on March 8, 2015 against Foolad as a starter.

Club career statistics

References

External links
 Milad Ahmadian at PersianLeague.com
 Milad Ahmadian at IranLeague.ir

Living people
1993 births
Iranian footballers
Paykan F.C. players
Sportspeople from Tehran
Association football goalkeepers